Taşbulak can refer to:

 Taşbulak, Hınıs
 Taşbulak, Kemah